= Pyrotrichus =

Pyrotrichus vitticollis

Scientific classification
- Kingdom: Animalia
- Phylum: Arthropoda
- Class: Insecta
- Order: Coleoptera
- Suborder: Polyphaga
- Infraorder: Cucujiformia
- Family: Cerambycidae
- Genus: Pyrotrichus
- Species: P. vitticollis

Binomial name
- Pyrotrichus vitticollis LeConte, 1862

Species of beetle

Pyrotrichus vitticollis is a species of beetle in the family Cerambycidae, the only species in the genus Pyrotrichus.
